This is a list of animated series with lesbian, gay, bisexual, transgender, intersex, asexual, genderqueer, and pansexual characters, along with other (LGBTQ) characters. This list includes fictional characters in animated cartoons, adult animation, and anime. This page includes some of those on the list of crossdressing characters in animated series.

These lists only include recurring characters, otherwise known as supporting characters, which appear frequently from time to time during the series' run, often playing major roles in more than one episode, and those in the main cast are listed below. LGBTQ characters which are guest stars or one-off characters are listed on the pages focusing exclusively on gay (in animation and anime), lesbian (in animation and anime), bisexual (in animation and anime), trans, pansexual, asexual, non-binary, and intersex characters.

The entries on this page are organized alphanumerically by duration dates and then alphabetically by the first letter of a specific series.

1960–1980s

1990s

The depiction of LGBTQ characters in animated series in the 1990s changed significantly from those in previous decades. Some of the most prominent series during this decade which featured LGBTQ characters were Sailor Moon, South Park, King of the Hill, Cardcaptor Sakura and Futurama. However, Revolutionary Girl Utena stood apart, with prominent LGBTQ characters, which some called one of the most important anime of the 1990s. It heavily influenced the creator of Steven Universe, Rebecca Sugar, calling a series which "plays with the semiotics of gender" which really stuck with her. Additionally, during this decade, Family Guy and SpongeBob SquarePants premiered, with LGBTQ protagonists in both shows, although it was only implied in the latter show.

For a further understanding of how these LGBTQ characters fit into the overall history of animation, please read the History of LGBT characters in animated series: 1990s page.

2000s

The depiction of LGBTQ characters in animated series in the 2000s changed significantly from the previous decade. In 1999, Simpsons and The Critic producer Mike Reiss who hoped to do something "good for the gay audience" produced Queer Duck, the first animated TV series with homosexuality as a predominant theme. The show became relatively influential after premiering online on Icebox.com, then later shown on Showtime starting in 2000, and was received well by some in the LGBTQ community. While LGBTQ characters appeared in shows such as The Grim Adventures of Billy & Mandy, Red vs. Blue, and The Boondocks, the ongoing show, American Dad, which premiered in 2005, had an LGBTQ character as a protagonist, Roger. While the gay news anchors Greg Corbin and Terry Bates were recurring characters in the show, Roger, a space alien who lives with the Smith family, has an ambiguous sexuality.

For a further understanding of how these LGBTQ characters fit into the overall history of animation, please read the History of LGBTQ characters in animated series: 2000s page.

2010s

The depiction of LGBTQ characters in animated series in the 2010s changed significantly from the previous decade; especially in Western animation. One of the shows cited as being the most influential for this change in representation is Steven Universe, created by Rebecca Sugar and aired on Cartoon Network. As GLAAD put it in their 2019-2020 report, the show continues to "go above and beyond when it comes to inclusive storytelling." The series, She-Ra and the Princesses of Power, developed by ND Stevenson, included LGBTQ characters, premiered in November 2018. Voltron: Legendary Defender, which aired from 2016 to 2018, attracted controversy for its depiction of LGBTQ characters, especially killing off a gay character, with some saying the show was following a stereotype known as "burying your gays" The 2010s also included LGBTQ characters in animated series, such as Marceline the Vampire Queen and Princess Bubblegum in Adventure Time, Korra and Asami in The Legend of Korra, and Mr. Ratburn and his husband from Arthur. Harley Quinn and Poison Ivy appeared in the first season of Harley Quinn from 2019 to 2020, but their romance was not expanded until seasons 2 and 3 in 2020 and 2022.

For a further understanding of how these LGBTQ characters fit into the overall history of animation, please read the History of LGBTQ characters in animated series: 2010s page.

2020s

The depiction of LGBT characters in animated series in the 2020s changed from the 2010s, accelerating like never seen before, especially when it came to Western animation. The Owl House featured some of the first LGBTQ protagonists in a Disney show, while Kipo and the Age of Wonderbeasts had a prominent gay relationship not previously seen in animation. In adult animation, Magical Girl Friendship Squad and Helluva Boss broke ground, the former with a lesbian protagonist and the latter with two bisexual characters and one pansexual character. However, in 2020, She-Ra and the Princesses of Power and Steven Universe Future, both of which had various LGBTQ characters, ended. In anime, LGBTQ characters appeared in various productions, such as Adachi and Shimamura, Assault Lily Bouquet, and My Next Life as a Villainess: All Routes Lead to Doom!.

For a further understanding of how these LGBTQ characters fit into the overall history of animation, please read the History of LGBT characters in animation: 2020s page.

See also

 List of fictional polyamorous characters
 List of LGBT-related films by year
 List of animated films with LGBT characters
 Lists of television programs with LGBT characters
 Lists of American television episodes with LGBT themes
 List of graphic art works with LGBT characters
 List of comedy television series with LGBT characters
 List of made-for-television films with LGBT characters
 List of dramatic television series with LGBT characters: 1960s–2000s
 List of dramatic television series with LGBT characters: 2010s
 List of dramatic television series with LGBT characters: 2020s

Notes

References

Bibliography
 
 
 

Animated
LGBT characters